George F. Milligan (February 23, 1934 – March 17, 1990) was an American Republican politician in the state of Iowa. He served in the Iowa State Senate from 1971 to 1975, and House of Representatives from 1969 to 1971.

Education and career 
Milligan was born in Des Moines, Iowa. A banker, he attended the Washington and Lee University.

In 1974, Milligan ran in the Republican primary against David Stanley for Iowa's Senate seat that was open after Harold Hughes announced his intention to leave after his term was over.

Death 
He died in Naples, Florida in 1990 due to a heart ailment.

References

1934 births
1990 deaths
Politicians from Des Moines, Iowa
Washington and Lee University alumni
Businesspeople from Iowa
Republican Party Iowa state senators
Republican Party members of the Iowa House of Representatives
20th-century American politicians